Richard Tryon  (31 August 1837 — 12 December 1905) was an English first-class cricketer and British Army officer.

The son of Thomas Tryon and Anne Trollope, he was born in August 1837 at Bulwick Park in the Northamptonshire village of Bulwick. He was commissioned into the British Army as an ensign in the Rifle Brigade in November 1854. Shortly after he was promoted to lieutenant in February 1855. Tryon purchased the rank of captain in July 1858, later retiring from active service nearly a decade later in May 1867. Tryon made a single appearance in first-class cricket for the Marylebone Cricket Club (MCC), captained by W. G. Grace, against Kent at Lord's in 1871. Batting once in the match, he was dismissed by Bob Lipscomb for 7 runs in the MCC first innings. 

A resident of The Lodge, Oakham in the County of Rutland, Tryon was nominated to be Sheriff of Rutland in November 1880. He was unsuccessful, with Francis Pierremont Cecil being made Sheriff; however, Cecil went on active naval service and was replaced by Tryon in April 1881. He was made a deputy lieutenant of Rutland in December 1901. He additionally served as a justice of the peace for Rutland. Tryon died at Marylebone in December 1905, following a short illness. 

He married Jane Anna Lucy Johnson, daughter of General William Augustus Johnson, in 1867. Two sons, Henry and Richard, were killed in the First World War. A brother was the Royal Navy Vice-Admiral Sir George Tryon.

Notes

References

External links

1837 births
1905 deaths
People from North Northamptonshire
Rifle Brigade officers
English cricketers
Marylebone Cricket Club cricketers
High Sheriffs of Rutland
Deputy Lieutenants of Rutland
English justices of the peace
People from Oakham